Michiel Dudok van Heel (20 October 1924 – 30 October 2003) was a sailor from the Netherlands. Together with his brother Biem Dudok van Heel and helmsman Wim van Duyl he finished in sixth place in the Dragon class at the 1952 Summer Olympics.

Sources
 
 
 

1924 births
2003 deaths
People from Huizen
Dutch male sailors (sport)
Sailors at the 1952 Summer Olympics – Dragon
Olympic sailors of the Netherlands
Sportspeople from North Holland